Forgacs Marine and Defence (Forgacs), former Forgacs Group, is a major Australian engineering and shipbuilding company. It has facilities at Newcastle, Sydney, Brisbane and Gladstone. The company employs 1000 people.

The Forgacs Group acquired Ullman Engineering in 1962 and in 1987, it acquired the Newcastle Floating Dock.

Shipbuilder Carrington Slipways was acquired in 1997, and the Cairncross Dockyard facilities in Brisbane in 1999. Cairncross is used for commercial ship repair and includes one of the largest graving docks in Australasia. The dockyard can accommodate ships up to the Panamax sized class.

The company's facilities at Cairncross Dockyard closed in 2014. On 17 November 2015, Civmec announced that it would acquire Forgacs. Civmec completed the acquisition of the Forgacs Group on 2 February 2016 and renamed it to Forgacs Marine and Defence.

See also

BAE Systems Australia

References

External links

Engineering companies of Australia
Shipbuilding companies of Australia